The SAI KZ IV was a light twin-engined aircraft first built in Denmark in 1944 for use as an air ambulance.

Design and construction
It was a conventional, low-wing cantilever monoplane with twin tails, mounted on the ends of the horizontal stabiliser. Power was provided by two engines mounted in nacelles on the wings that also housed the main units of the fixed, tailwheel undercarriage. The cabin could hold two stretchers, two medical attendants, and a flight crew of two.

Operational history

A single machine, registered OY-DIZ, was built during the war, with a second aircraft registered OY-DZU being built and flown in 1949. That same year, the OY-DIZ was christened with the name Folke Bernadotte in honour of the Swedish count who had used this very aircraft to make a diplomatic visit to Germany to negotiate for the release of Danish prisoners in German concentration camps near the end of the war. This aircraft is now the "flagship" of the Danmarks Flymuseum collection, having been restored to its original wartime configuration and markings following a career as a utility aircraft in England and a crash in 1979. The second aircraft was actively operational until the mid 1960s.

Specifications

References

 
 
 Danmarks Flymuseum page on the KZ IV (in Danish)
 Уголок неба

External links
 

1940s Danish civil utility aircraft
Skandinavisk Aero Industri aircraft
Low-wing aircraft
Aircraft first flown in 1944
Twin piston-engined tractor aircraft